Diane Hoh is an American author of young adult horror, best known for her Nightmare Hall series and Point Horror novels. She grew up in Warren, Pennsylvania but currently resides in Austin, Texas.

Reception
Reception to Hoh's work has been mixed to positive. Titanic: The Long Night was positively received by The Hamilton Spectator.

Bibliography

Nightmare Hall
The Silent Scream (1993)
The Roommate (1993)
Deadly Attraction (1993)
The Wish (1993)
The Scream Team (1993)
Guilty (1993)
Pretty Please (1994)
The Experiment (1994)
The Night Walker (1994)
Sorority Sister (1994)
Last Date (1994)
The Whisperer (1994)
Monster (1994)
The Initiation (1994)
Truth or Die (1993)
Book of Horrors (1994)
Last Breath (1994)
Win, Lose or Die (1994)
The Coffin (1995)
Deadly Visions (1995)
Student Body (1995)
The Vampire's Kiss (1995)
Dark Moon (1995)
The Biker (1995)
Captives (1995)
Revenge (1995)
Kidnapped (1995)
The Dummy (1995)
The Voice in the Mirror (1995)

Med Center
Virus (1996)
Flood (1996)
Fire (1996)
Blast (1996)
Blizzard (1996)
Poison (1997)

Stand alone novels
Brian's Girl (1985)
Loving That O'Connor Boy (1985)
Slow Dance (1989)
Funhouse (1990)
The Invitation (1991)
The Accident (1991)
The Fever (1992)
The Train (1992)
Prom Date (1996)
Blindfold (1997)
Don't Let Me Die! (August 28, 1998)
Titanic: The Long Night (1998)
Remembering the Titanic (1998)
Blindfold (1999)

Anthologies
Thirteen: 13 Tales of Horror by 13 Masters of Horror – ed. T. Pines; contains Hoh's short story Dedicated to the One I Love.(1991)

See also

List of horror fiction authors

References

External links

20th-century American novelists
American women novelists
American horror writers
Living people
Year of birth missing (living people)
Women horror writers
20th-century American women writers
People from Warren, Pennsylvania
21st-century American women